is a high school in Izu Ōshima, Izu Islands, Tokyo.

References

External links
 Oshima High School 

Izu Islands
Tokyo Metropolitan Government Board of Education schools
High schools in Tokyo